Tiago Uriel Pacheco Lezcano (born August 3, 2001), better known by his stage name Tiago PZK, is an Argentine rapper and singer, mostly related with R&B, rap and reggaeton. His hit-singles are "Sola", "Además de Mí", "Entre Nosotros", "Salimo de Noche", and "Cerca de Ti".

Career 
The artist, whose real name is Tiago Uriel Pacheco Lezcano, uses the suffix PZK in honor of his freestyle crew in Argentina. Tiago began gaining notoriety around 2016 with his participation in local rap battles in Argentina and his self-released track, "Andamo en la Cima". In 2019, he signed to indie SyP Recors in Argentina, eventually catching the eye of concert promoter Phil Rodriguez, the CEO of Move Concerts, one of Latin America's biggest indie promoters. Rodriguez signed Tiago to management and to his new Grand Move Records label. In 2022, the artist signed a record deal with Warner Music Latina.

By January 2022, Tiago was the artist with the most number-one singles on the Billboard Argentina Hot 100 chart, with four: "Además de Mí (Remix)", "No Me Conocen (Remix)", "Entre Nosotros", and "Salimo de Noche". He is now tied with María Becerra.

The release of Tiago's first album Portales met with controversy over lyrics that were characterised as racist; the track "Sabor a Miel" includes the line "he smokes and his eyes look like BTS." The singer later apologized on Twitter to the "people who were offended."

Influences and style 
Tiago's music "defies categorization, often shifting from R&B and even pop to rap. And instead of resorting to the sexually explicit lyrics that define so many reggaetón hits today, Tiago’s themes lean more toward love and loss and his own journey from the housing projects of Buenos Aires to nascent fame." Tiago has listed Daddy Yankee, Tego Calderón and Justin Bieber as music influences. Today, Yankee's street music and Bieber's pop essence reflect in Tiago's diverse sound, which he says is "limitless": "I am not pigeonholed into a single genre. If I have to, I'll do reggaeton, rock, dancehall, and R&B."

Filmography

Films 
 Cato (2021)

Discography

Studio albums 
 Portales (2022)

EPs 
 Valor de Calle (2019, with Emkier)

Soundtracks 
 Cato (2021)

Singles

As lead artist

Other charted songs

Footnotes 

Notes for peak chart positions

References 

Argentine rappers
Argentine trap musicians
Argentine reggaeton musicians
Latin trap musicians
2001 births
Living people
Warner Music Latina artists